Carole Laure O.C. (born August 5, 1948) is an actress and singer from Quebec, Canada.

Career

Throughout most of her career, Carole Laure primarily collaborated with Anglophone singer, songwriter, producer, and director Lewis Furey, whom she met in 1977 and who later became her husband.

Laure was appointed an Officer of the Order of Canada in 2013, "For her international career as an actress, singer, director and dancer."

Singing career
Laure debuted as a singer on the album Alibis in 1978.

In 1989, she devoted an acoustic-oriented bilingual album, Western Shadows, to country and western standards. The album featured cover versions of Tammy Wynette's "Stand by Your Man", Phil Spector's "To Know Him Is to Love Him", Rosanne Cash's "Seven Year Ache", and Leonard Cohen's "Coming Back to You". The video for "Danse avant de tomber" (a cover of Boris Bergman's French adaptation of Doc Pomus' "Save the Last Dance for Me") featured dancer Louise Lecavalier of the internationally famous Québec contemporary dance troupe La La La Human Steps.

For her 1991 album She Says Move On, she recorded a cover version of Jimi Hendrix's "Purple Haze".

She switched from acoustic to electronic music on her 1997 French-language album Sentiments Naturels. The album featured club-oriented genres such as techno, house, and trip hop, and collaborators included Dimitri from Paris, Mirwais, Shazz, DJ Cam, and Todd Terry. Laure was also named in the songwriting credits.

Acting career
Laure is also a film actress, appearing in a number of Canadian-produced films, including the controversial 1974 release by Dušan Makavejev Sweet Movie, which was notable for both its sexual explicitness and scatology. Laure and Furey were frequent co-stars in the films of Gilles Carle, most notably, L'Ange et la femme (1977) and Fantastica (1980). She also stars alongside Sylvester Stallone and Michael Caine in the 1981 film Escape to Victory.

Discography

Albums
 Alibis (1978)
 Carole Laure/Lewis Furey Fantastica (1980)
 Carole Laure/Lewis Furey Enregistrement Public au Théâtre de la Porte Saint-Martin (1982)
 Carole Laure/Lewis Furey Night Magic (1985)
 Western Shadows (1989)
 She Says Move On (1991)
 Sentiments Naturels (1997)
 Collection Légende (1999)

Singles
 "J'ai une chanson" (1978)
 "See you Monday" (with Lewis Furey) (1979)
 "Fantastica" (with Lewis Furey) (1980)
 "I should have known / Slowly, I married her" (with Lewis Furey) (1982)
 "Danse avant de tomber" (1989)
 "Anybody with the Blues" (1990)
 "She says move on" (1991)
 "Perds ton temps" (1992)
 "Mirage Geisho" (New version) (1993)
 "Passe de toi" (1996)
 "Sentiments naturels" (1997)
 "Dormir" (Sampler) (1997)

Filmography
(mainly French language)

Mon enfance à Montréal (1971)
The Apprentice (Fleur bleue) (1971) as Suzanne
IXE-13 (1972) as Shaïra
Series 4 (1972)
La Porteuse de pain (TV miniseries) (1973) as Marie Harmant
La Mort d'un bûcheron (1973) as Marie Chapdeleine
The Heavenly Bodies (Les Corps célestes) (1973) as Rose-Marie
Sweet Movie (1974) as Miss Monde 1984 / Miss Canada
La Tête de Normande St-Onge (1975) as Normande St-Onge
A Thousand Moons (1975)
Né pour l'enfer (Born for Hell) (1976) as Amy
Strange Shadows in an Empty Room (1976) as Louise Saitta
A Pacemaker and a Sidecar (L'Eau chaude, l'eau frette) (1976) as Amoureuse
The Angel and the Woman (L'Ange et la femme) (1977) as Girl
La Menace (1977) as Julie Manet, a Canadian Girl
Préparez vos mouchoirs (Get Out Your Handkerchiefs) (1977) as Solange
La Jument vapeur (1978) as Armelle Bertrand
Inside Out (1979)
Au revoir à lundi (1979) as Lucie Leblanc
Fantastica (1980) as Lorca
Asphalte (1981) as Juliette Delors
 (1981) as Pauline Klein
Escape to Victory (Victory) (1981) as Renee - The French
Croque la vie (1981) as Thérèse
Maria Chapdelaine (1983) as Maria Chapdelaine
À mort l'arbitre (1984) as Martine
Stress (1984) as Nathalie
Heartbreakers (1984) as Liliane
The Surrogate (1984) as Anouk Van Derlin
Night Magic (1985) as Judy
Drôle de samedi (1985) as Véronique 
Sauve-toi, Lola (1986) as Lola
Sweet Country (1987) as Eva
La Nuit avec Hortense (1988) as Hortense
La Vie en couleurs (TV) (1989) as Laura
Palace (TV miniseries) (1989) as La cliente à la mouche / Sylvie, la femme du service des rêves
Thank You Satan (1989) as France Monnier
Beau fixe sur Cormeilles (1989)
Les Aventuriers d'Eden River (Flight from Justice) (TV) (1993) as Dr. Ann Stephens
Elles ne pensent qu'à ça... (1994) as Jess 
Rats and Rabbits (2000) as Rita
Les Fils de Marie (2002) as Marie
Primitifs (2002)
The Beautiful Beast (La Belle bête) (2006) as Louise
La Capture (Director, 2007)
Love Project (Love Projet) — 2014, director

References

External links

RFI Musique - CAROLE LAURE June 1998

Officers of the Order of Canada
Canadian film actresses
1948 births
Living people
Actresses from Quebec
Singers from Quebec
French Quebecers
French-language singers of Canada
People from Shawinigan
Canadian women pop singers